Zakharivka Raion;, until May 2016 Frunzivka Raion;, was a raion (district) in Odessa Oblast in southwestern Ukraine. The administrative center of the raion was the urban-type settlement of Zakharivka. The raion was abolished and its territory was merged into Rozdilna Raion on 18 July 2020 as part of the administrative reform of Ukraine, which reduced the number of raions of Odessa Oblast to seven.  The last estimate of the raion population was 

On 19 May 2016, Verkhovna Rada adopted decision to rename Frunzivka to Zakharivka and Frunzivka Raion to Zakharivka Raion conform to the law prohibiting names of Communist origin.

Subdivisions
Zakharivka Raion Raion consisted of 2 urban-type settlements (Zakharivka, Zatyshshia) and 51 villages. The settlements of Zakharivka Raion were:

 Andrusova  (Андрусова)
 Balashove (Балашове) 
 Birnosove (Бірносове) 
 Bohdanove Pershe (Богданове Перше) 
 Chervona Stinka (Червона Стінка)
 Dementivka (Дементівка) 
 Druzhelubivka (Дружелюбівка) 
 Fedosiivka (Федосіївка) 
 Hederymove Pershe (Гедеримове Перше) 
 Hirkivka (Гірківка) 
 Hlybokoyar (Глибокояр) 
 Ivanivka (Іванівка) 
 Karabanove (Карабанове) 
 Kosharka (Кошарка) 
 Krasnopil' (Краснопіль) 
 Krympul’ka (Кримпулька)
 Lenine (Леніне) 
 Maiors’ke (Майорське) 
 Mala Toporivka (Мала Топорівка) 
 Maloroshove (Малорошове) 
 Mar’yanivka (Мар'янівка) 
 Nova Hryhorivka (Нова Григорівка) 
 Nova Shybka (Нова Шибка) 
 Novomykolaivka (Новомиколаївка) 
 Novopavlivka (Новопавлівка) 
 Novozarits’ke (Новозаріцьке) 
 Olenivka, Frunzivka Raion (Оленівка) 
 Onylove (Онилове) 
 Pavlivka (Павлівка) 
 Parkanivka (Парканівка) 
 Perekhrestove (Перехрестове) 
 Perekhrestove Pershe (Перехрестове Перше) 
 Pervomais’ke (Первомайське) 
 Pershe Travnya (Перше Травня) 
 Petrivka (Mar’yanivka) (Петрівка (Мар'янівська сільська рада)) 
 Petrivka (Perekhrestove) (Петрівка (Перехрестівська сільська рада)) 
 Rosiyanivka (Росіянівка) 
 Samiilivka (Самійлівка) 
 Savchyns’ke (Савчинське) 
 Skyneshory  (Скинешори) 
 Stoyanove (Стоянове) 
 Untylivka (Унтилівка) 
 Vasylivka (Василівка) 
 Vesela Balka (Весела Балка) 
 Voinycheve (Войничеве) 
  (Володимирівка)
 Yelyzavetivka (Єлизаветівка) 
 Yosypivka (Йосипівка) 
 Zahir'ya (Загір'я) 
 Zhyhailove (Жигайлове)

References

Former raions of Odesa Oblast
1923 establishments in Ukraine
Ukrainian raions abolished during the 2020 administrative reform